Liu Wu may refer to:

Liu Wu, Prince of Chu, who joined the Rebellion of Seven States during the early Han Dynasty
Liu Wu, Prince of Liang, who opposed them
Liu Wu (general), Tang Dynasty general served during Emperor Xianzong's reign

See also
 Liu (surname)